Tímea Nagy (born 22 August 1970) is a Hungarian right-handed épée fencer, three-time Olympian, 2006 individual world champion, and two-time Olympic champion.

Awards
 Hungarian Fencer of the Year (3): 2000, 2004, 2006
 National Defence awards, I.class (2005)
 Hungarian Sportswoman of the Year (1) - votes of sports journalists: 2006
 Hungarian Athlete of the Year (1) - the National Sports Association (NSSZ) awards: 2006
 Príma award (2007)
 Women in sport award (2011)
 Csík Ferenc award (2007)
 Member of International Fencing Federation (FIE) Hall of Fame (2013)

Orders and special awards
  Order of Merit of the Republic of Hungary – Officer's Cross (2000)
  Order of Merit of the Republic of Hungary – Commander's Cross (2004)

References

External links

 Profile 

1970 births
Living people
Fencers from Budapest
Hungarian female épée fencers
Fencers at the 1996 Summer Olympics
Fencers at the 2000 Summer Olympics
Fencers at the 2004 Summer Olympics
Olympic fencers of Hungary
Olympic gold medalists for Hungary
Olympic medalists in fencing
Medalists at the 2000 Summer Olympics
Medalists at the 2004 Summer Olympics
Universiade medalists in fencing
Universiade gold medalists for Hungary
Medalists at the 1995 Summer Universiade
Medalists at the 1997 Summer Universiade
20th-century Hungarian women
21st-century Hungarian women